Habenaria ferdinandi, commonly known as the yellow rein orchid, is a species of orchid that is endemic to the Northern Territory. It usually has two leaves at its base and up to fifteen tiny yellowish green, strongly scented flowers.

Description
Flowering occurs from December to March.

Taxonomy and naming
Habenaria ferdinandi was first formally described in 1911 by Rudolf Schlechter, although he initially gave it the name Habenaria muelleriana, an illegitimate name because it had been used for a different species by Alfred Cogniaux. The original and the correction were published in Repertorium Specierum Novarum Regni Vegetabilis. The specific epithet (ferdinandi) honours the botanist Ferdinand von Mueller.

Distribution and habitat
The yellow rein is found in northern parts of the Northern Territory where it grows in grassy forest and at the base of sandstone escarpments.

References

Orchids of the Northern Territory
Orchids of New Guinea
Endemic orchids of Australia
Plants described in 1911
ferdinandi